Adam David Riggs (born October 4, 1972) is a former professional baseball first baseman. He played parts of four years in Major League Baseball, but is better known for the four seasons he spent with the Tokyo Yakult Swallows of the Japanese Central League.

A native of Byram Township, New Jersey, he attended Lenape Valley Regional High School in Stanhope, New Jersey, and is an alumnus of the County College of Morris and the University of South Carolina Aiken.

Baseball career
Adam Riggs played for the USC Aiken Pacers for the 1993 and 1994 seasons. Drafted by the Los Angeles Dodgers in the 22nd round of the 1994 Major League Baseball June Amateur Draft, Riggs made his Major League Baseball debut with the Dodgers on August 7, 1997.

Riggs gained notoriety after a 2003 game with the Anaheim Angels in which he wore a uniform which featured the team name misspelled as "Angees", which appeared in Sports Illustrated, and was also nominated for a This Year in Baseball Award for Most Bizarre Moment in 2003.

In 2005 he signed with the Yakult Swallows of Japan's Central League and played with them until July 2008.

Mitchell Report

On December 13, 2007, Riggs was included in the Mitchell Report, in which it was alleged that he used steroids during his career.  In the report, Kirk Radomski states that Riggs bought human growth hormone, clenbuterol, and Winstrol from him between July 10, 2003, to November 30, 2005. Photocopies of five checks from Riggs to Radomski are included in the report to substantiate Radomski's accusations.   Radomski claims Riggs was referred to him by Paul Lo Duca.  Riggs declined to meet with the Mitchell investigators but provided a letter from his lawyer stating that he "never tested positive for improper substances".

From 2005 to 2008, Riggs played in Japan where they conform with Olympic testing standards and never tested positive for performance-enhancing drugs while with the Tokyo Yakult Swallows.

References

External links

 Japanese foreign batting stats

1972 births
Living people
Albuquerque Dukes players
American expatriate baseball players in Japan
American expatriate baseball players in Mexico
Anaheim Angels players
Baseball players from Ohio
Great Falls Dodgers players
Los Angeles Dodgers players
Major League Baseball first basemen
Major League Baseball left fielders
Major League Baseball outfielders
Major League Baseball second basemen
Memphis Redbirds players
Mexican League baseball first basemen
Mexican League baseball third basemen
Morris Titans baseball players
Nippon Professional Baseball first basemen
Nippon Professional Baseball outfielders
Nippon Professional Baseball third basemen
People from Byram Township, New Jersey
Portland Beavers players
Salt Lake Stingers players
San Antonio Missions players
San Bernardino Spirit players
San Diego Padres players
Saraperos de Saltillo players
Sportspeople from Steubenville, Ohio
Tokyo Yakult Swallows players
USC Aiken Pacers baseball players
Yakima Bears players
Yakult Swallows players